is the former governor of Fukuoka Prefecture in Japan, first elected in 1995. A native of Kitakyūshū, Fukuoka and graduate of Kyoto University, he joined the Ministry of International Trade and Industry in 1963. He retired on 22 April 2011, and Hiroshi Ogawa replaced him as governor. Keiji Yamada took over as President of the Governor's Association.

References

External links 
  *
 English language NGA website

1939 births
Living people
People from Kitakyushu
Kyoto University alumni
Governors of Fukuoka Prefecture